The 1942–43 Illinois Fighting Illini men's basketball team represented the University of Illinois.

Regular season
The 1942–43 Illinois Fighting Illini men’s basketball team represented the University of Illinois. The Illinois Fighting Illini finished the season with a record of 17 wins and 1 loss. The season was cut short as three of the five starters headed off to active duty in the armed forces. Illinois won the Big Ten Conference Title and had finished the regular season as the nations' top ranked team. Paced by a group of players known as the Whiz Kids, the team consisted of 20-year-old All-America forward Andy Phillip and teenagers Ken Menke, Gene Vance, Jack Smiley and team captain Art Mathisen. These players were so dominant in the Big Ten, that only Northwestern's Otto Graham could crack the all-conference team.

The Army drafted Mathisen, Menke and Smiley. That left only Vance and Phillip, both good enough to be selected to Illinois' All-Century team. Head coach Doug Mills made a decision in February 1943 that all five always supported, the club did not participate in either the NCAA or NIT tournament. Wyoming's NCAA championship that season may not have happened had Illinois’ season not coincided with World War II. The team was retroactively named the national champion by the Premo-Porretta Power Poll.

Four of the five, minus Mathisen, returned to Illinois and tried to recapture the glory for one more season in 1946–47 after the war ended, but the chemistry had changed as well as their talent. Illinois went 14–6.

The final living Whiz Kid, Gene Vance, died in 2012.

Roster

Source

Schedule

|-
!colspan=12 style="background:#DF4E38; color:white;"| Non-Conference regular season

|- align="center" bgcolor=""

|-
!colspan=9 style="background:#DF4E38; color:#FFFFFF;"|Big Ten regular season

Bold Italic connotes conference game
												
Source

Player stats

Awards and honors
Andy Phillip
National Player of the Year
Consensus All-American
Converse 1st team All-American
Helms 1st team All-American
Pic Magazine 1st team All-American
Look Magazine 1st team All-American
Sporting News 1st team All-American
Associated Press 1st team All-American
United Press International 1st team All-American
National Enterprise Association 1st team All-American
Big Ten Player of the Year
Team Most Valuable Player
Fighting Illini All-Century team (2005)
Gene Vance 
Converse Honorable Mention All-American
Fighting Illini All-Century team (2005)
Jack Smiley
Converse 3rd team All-American
Art Mathisen
Converse Honorable mention All-American

References

Illinois Fighting Illini
Illinois Fighting Illini men's basketball seasons
1942 in sports in Illinois
1943 in sports in Illinois